The Review of Accounting Studies Journal is a quarterly peer-reviewed academic journal covering topics in the field of accounting.  It was established in 1995 and is published by Springer Science+Business Media. The current managing editor is Patricia Dechow from the University of Southern California.

According to the Journal Citation Reports, the journal has a 2011 impact factor of 2.022, ranking it 10th out of 86 journals in the category "Business, Finance".

References

External links 
 
 Print: 
 Electronic: 

Accounting journals
Springer Science+Business Media academic journals
Publications established in 1996
English-language journals
Quarterly journals